The Leinster Senior Camogie Championship is a competition for inter-county teams in the women's field sport of game of camogie played in Leinster.

Roll of Honour

See also
 All-Ireland Senior Camogie Championship

References

Camogie competitions